Hulot may refer to:

People
 Anatole Hulot (1811–1891), French civil servant
 Nicolas Hulot (born 1955), French ecologist

Places
 Hulot Peninsula, Antarctica

Other
 Monsieur Hulot, title character in Les Vacances de Monsieur Hulot by Jacques Tati

See also
 Jean-Marie Hullot (1954-2019), French computer scientist